Logan Township is a township in Gloucester County in the U.S. state of New Jersey. As of the 2020 United States census, the township's population was 6,000, a decrease of 42 (−.7%) from the 2010 census count of 6,042, which in turn reflected an increase of 10 (+0.2%) from the 6,032 counted in the 2000 census.

Logan Township was formed as West Woolwich Township by the New Jersey Legislature on March 7, 1877, from portions of Woolwich Township. That name lasted just less than a year, as the name was changed to Logan Township as of March 6, 1878. The community is named for John Alexander "Black Jack" Logan, a Union Army general who was behind the establishment of Memorial Day as a national holiday.

Geography
According to the U.S. Census Bureau, the township had a total area of 26.60 square miles (68.89 km2), including 21.93 square miles (56.79 km2) of land and 4.67 square miles (12.09 km2) of water (17.55%).

Beckett, with a 2010 census population of 4,847, is an unincorporated community and census-designated place (CDP) located in the township.

Other unincorporated communities, localities, and places located partially or completely within the township include Bridgeport, Cadwalader, Center Square, Cooper Wharf, Coopers, Flood Gates, New Bridge, Nortonville, Prospect, Raccoon Island, and Repaupo. The township is home to Pureland Industrial Complex, a  industrial park that is one of the nation's largest. The township also hosts the Delaware River Equestrian Agriculture Marina (DREAM) Park, a 1,600-acre County Park.

The township borders the Gloucester County municipalities of Greenwich Township and Woolwich Township. Logan Township also borders the Delaware River. Oldmans Creek serves as its border with Oldmans Township in Salem County. Raccoon Creek branches off from the Delaware River in Logan Township.

Demographics

2010 census

The Census Bureau's 2006–2010 American Community Survey showed that (in 2010 inflation-adjusted dollars) median household income was $87,209 (with a margin of error of +/− $6,583) and the median family income was $100,688 (+/− $14,321). Males had a median income of $67,192 (+/− $7,690) versus $49,914 (+/− $4,283) for females. The per capita income for the borough was $35,587 (+/− $2,882). About 1.6% of families and 3.7% of the population were below the poverty line, including 2.4% of those under age 18 and none of those age 65 or over.

2000 census
As of the 2000 census, there were 6,032 people, 2,001 households, and 1,610 families residing in the township. The racial makeup of the township was 82.00% White, 13.51% African American, 0.13% Native American, 1.77% Asian, 0.02% Pacific Islander, 1.21% from other races, and 1.36% from two or more races. Hispanic or Latino of any race were 2.74% of the population.

There were 2,001 households, of which 48.1% had children under the age of 18 living with them, 66.3% were married couples living together, 10.1% had a female householder with no husband present, and 19.5% were non-families. 15.7% of all households were made up of individuals, and 4.3% had someone living alone who was 65 years of age or older. The average household size was 3.00 and the average family size was 3.38.

In the township, the population was spread out, with 32.1% under the age of 18, 6.0% from 18 to 24, 35.4% from 25 to 44, 20.3% from 45 to 64, and 6.2% who were 65 years of age or older. The median age was 34 years. For every 100 females, there were 97.3 males. For every 100 females age 18 and over, there were 93.5 males.

The median income for a household in the township was $67,148, and the median income for a family was $70,771. Males had a median income of $48,415 versus $34,864 for females. The per capita income for the township was $26,853. About 3.0% of families and 4.3% of the population were below the poverty line, including 5.3% of those under age 18 and 1.0% of those age 65 or over.

Economy
Pureland Industrial Complex was established in the early 1970s when 45 farms comprising  were assembled in Logan Township. Under the ownership of State Mutual Life Assurance Company of America, environmental studies were undertaken by Jack McCormick, the first scientist with a doctorate in environmental science. In 1971, The New York Times described the project as "the nation's first ecologically planned industrial complex".

In 1973, the Pureland Association was formed and Declaration of Environmental Standards were established and recorded in Gloucester County. Approximately  were placed in an environmental reserve in perpetuity and rigid environmental controls were established, prior to the establishment of the United States Environmental Protection Agency or the New Jersey Department of Environmental Protection. These restrictive covenants protect property owners' value and are enforced by the Pureland Association which consist of property owners.

In 1976, the initial infrastructure was established with public water, sewer, and rail servicing Pureland. In 1977, Center Square Real Estate Development Company took over management of Pureland for State Mutual Life Assurance Company of America. In 2000, Center Square Real Estate Development Company purchased the undeveloped land from State Mutual and continues to manage and develop Pureland today.

It is the largest industrial complex in New Jersey.

Logan Township was the proposed location for the Crown Landing LNG Terminal, a liquefied natural gas (LNG) off-loading and processing facility to be sited along the Delaware River. The facility would have included an off-loading pier that would technically enter the waters of the state of Delaware. Delaware opposed the project and filed a lawsuit in federal court to stop the project from going forward on the basis that they control the waters in which part of the pier would be situated; a lawsuit the State of Delaware lost. The Federal Energy Regulatory Commission approved the Crown Landing LNG Terminal on June 15, 2006. In 2009, long after the project should have been completed, Hess Energy acquired the project after BP failed to get plans approved and construction started. On January 6, 2012, Hess Energy surrendered its authorization to construct and operate the terminal. In a letter to the Federal Energy Regulatory Commission (FERC), Hess said it determined that the terminal would not be profitable, saying that "significant increases in natural gas production from North American shale resources" would affect prices and demand for natural gas.

Government

Local government 
Logan Township is governed within the Faulkner Act, formally known as the Optional Municipal Charter Law, under the Small Municipality (Plan 3) form of New Jersey municipal government, enacted by direct petition as of January 1, 1984. The township is one of 18 municipalities (of the 564) statewide that use this form of government, which is only available to municipalities with less than 12,000 at the time of adoption. The governing body is comprised of a Mayor and a Township Council, with all positions elected at-large on a partisan basis as part of the November general elections. The Mayor is elected directly by the voters to a four-year term of office. The four members of the Township Council are elected to serve three-year terms on a staggered basis, with either one or two seats up for election each year.

This governing body, comprised of five members, oversees the operation of the township, passing resolutions and ordinances, as well as assessing and collecting taxes. Meetings of the Mayor and Township Council are held on a monthly basis and are open to the public. All Legislative powers of the Township are exercised by the Mayor and Council.

, the Mayor of Logan Township is Democrat Frank W. Minor, whose term of office ends December 31, 2023. Members of the Logan Township Council are Deputy Mayor Bernadine E. Jackson (D, 2024), Doris Hall (D, 2022), Christopher Morris (D, 2023) and Arthur Smith (D, 2022).

Federal, state, and county representation 
Logan Township is located in the 2nd Congressional District and is part of New Jersey's 3rd state legislative district.

Politics
As of March 2011, there were a total of 4,029 registered voters in Logan Township, of which 1,652 (41.0%) were registered as Democrats, 695 (17.2%) were registered as Republicans and 1,678 (41.6%) were registered as Unaffiliated. There were four voters registered as Libertarians or Greens.

In the 2012 presidential election, Democrat Barack Obama received 59.7% of the vote (1,779 cast), ahead of Republican Mitt Romney with 38.9% (1,157 votes), and other candidates with 1.4% (42 votes), among the 2,997 ballots cast by the township's 4,214 registered voters (19 ballots were spoiled), for a turnout of 71.1%. In the 2008 presidential election, Democrat Barack Obama received 59.3% of the vote (1,868 cast), ahead of Republican John McCain with 38.7% (1,219 votes) and other candidates with 1.4% (43 votes), among the 3,151 ballots cast by the township's 4,142 registered voters, for a turnout of 76.1%. In the 2004 presidential election, Democrat John Kerry received 54.2% of the vote (1,600 ballots cast), outpolling Republican George W. Bush with 44.4% (1,311 votes) and other candidates with 0.7% (28 votes), among the 2,952 ballots cast by the township's 3,820 registered voters, for a turnout percentage of 77.3.

In the 2013 gubernatorial election, Republican Chris Christie received 62.6% of the vote (1,041 cast), ahead of Democrat Barbara Buono with 35.6% (591 votes), and other candidates with 1.8% (30 votes), among the 1,703 ballots cast by the township's 4,133 registered voters (41 ballots were spoiled), for a turnout of 41.2%. In the 2009 gubernatorial election, Democrat Jon Corzine received 49.8% of the vote (939 ballots cast), ahead of Republican Chris Christie with 39.5% (745 votes), Independent Chris Daggett with 8.6% (162 votes) and other candidates with 0.7% (13 votes), among the 1,886 ballots cast by the township's 4,103 registered voters, yielding a 46.0% turnout.

Education 
The Logan Township School District serves public school students in pre-kindergarten through eighth grade. As of the 2021–22 school year, the district, comprised of three schools, had an enrollment of 876 students and 82.5 classroom teachers (on an FTE basis), for a student–teacher ratio of 10.6:1. Schools in the district (with 2021–22 enrollment data from the National Center for Education Statistics) are 
Francis E. Donnelly Early Childhood Learning Center with 197 students in grades PreK-K, 
Logan Elementary School with 302 students in grades 1-4 and 
Logan Middle School with 372 students in grades 5-8.

Public school students in ninth through twelfth grades are educated at Kingsway Regional High School under a sending/receiving relationship in which tuition is paid on a per-pupil basis to the Kingsway Regional School District, which serves students in seventh through twelfth grades from East Greenwich Township, South Harrison Township, Swedesboro and Woolwich Township. As of the 2021–22 school year, the district, comprised of two schools, had an enrollment of 2,863 students and 231.8 classroom teachers (on an FTE basis), for a student–teacher ratio of 12.4:1. Schools in the district (with 2021–22 enrollment data from the National Center for Education Statistics) are 
Kingsway Regional Middle School with 925 students in grades 7-8 and 
Kingsway Regional High School with 1,893 students in grades 9-12. Under a 2011 proposal, Kingsway would merge with its constituent member's K–6 districts to become a full K–12 district, with various options for including Logan Township as part of the consolidated district.

Students from across the county are eligible to apply to attend Gloucester County Institute of Technology, a four-year high school in Deptford Township that provides technical and vocational education. As a public school, students do not pay tuition to attend the school. There are 60 students from the township who attend GCIT.

Guardian Angels Regional School (PreK–Grade 3 campus in Gibbstown CDP and 4–8 campus in Paulsboro) takes students from Logan Township. The school operates under the supervision of the Roman Catholic Diocese of Camden.

Transportation

Roads and highways

Several state highways pass through the township. These include U.S. Route 130, U.S. Route 322/County Route 536, Route 324, which runs for  entirely in Logan Township, and Interstate 295.

The Commodore Barry Bridge is a cantilever bridge that spans the Delaware River from Chester, Pennsylvania to the Bridgeport section of Logan Township as part of US 322. Owned and operated by the Delaware River Port Authority, construction of the bridge began in 1969 and the bridge opened to traffic in February 1974. The bridge is named for the American Revolutionary War hero and Philadelphia resident, John Barry.

Public transportation
NJ Transit bus service is available between in the township between Pennsville Township and Philadelphia on the 402 route.

Notable people

People who were born in, residents of, or otherwise closely associated with Logan Township include:
 Edward Durr (born 1963), politician and truck driver who represents the 3rd Legislative district in the New Jersey Senate

Wineries
 Cedarvale Winery

References

External links

Official Logan Township website

 
1877 establishments in New Jersey
Faulkner Act (small municipality)
New Jersey populated places on the Delaware River
Populated places established in 1877
Townships in Gloucester County, New Jersey